Francis Leyborne Popham (14 October 1809 – 30 July 1880) was an English barrister and cricketer. He was associated with Oxford University Cricket Club and made his first-class debut in 1829.

Popham was a member of the Popham family which at that time owned Littlecote House near Ramsbury.  He was educated at Harrow School and University College, Oxford, matriculating in 1827. He graduated in 1831 and was a fellow of All Souls College, Oxford, 1831–43. He studied law at Lincoln's Inn and was called to the bar in 1837.

Popham bred and owned the racehorse Wild Dayrell, winner of the 1855 Derby.

References

1809 births
1880 deaths
Francis Leyborne
English cricketers of 1826 to 1863
Oxford University cricketers
People educated at Harrow School
Alumni of University College, Oxford
Fellows of All Souls College, Oxford
British racehorse owners and breeders
Owners of Epsom Derby winners
Gentlemen of Kent cricketers
English cricketers